Constance is an unincorporated community in Boone County, Kentucky, United States.

A post office called Constance was established in 1855, and remained in operation until November 1997. The ZIP Code for Constance was 41009, which has since been retired. It is unknown why the name "Constance" was applied to this community.

The Henry and Agnes Rolsen House and the south end of the Anderson Ferry, which are both listed on the National Register of Historic Places, are located in Constance.

References

Unincorporated communities in Boone County, Kentucky
Unincorporated communities in Kentucky